A patent map is a graphical model of patent visualisation. This practice "enables companies to identify the patents in a particular technology space, verify the characteristics of these patents, and ... identify the relationships among them, to see if there are any zones of infringement." Patent mapping is also referred to as patent landscaping.

See also
 Patent analysis

References

External links
 Patent statistics and patent mapping FAQ at the European Patent Office
 Guide Book for Practical Use of "Patent Map for Each Technology Field", Invention Research Institute, Japan Institute of Invention and Innovation, Japan Patent Office, Asia-Pacific Industrial Property Center, JIII (2000)

Business intelligence terms
Map, patent